Jordan Yamoah Amissah (born 2 August 2001) is a German professional footballer who plays as an goalkeeper for Burton Albion, on loan from EFL Championship club Sheffield United.

Career
Amissah is a youth product of the academies of the German clubs Holsterhausen Herne, VfL Bochum, Schalke 04 and Borussia Dortmund before moving to England with the youth sides of Sheffield United in 2018. On 21 May 2021, he signed his first professional contract with Sheffield United. He began his senior career on loan with Guiseley in the National League North for the first half of the 2021–22 season. In January 2022 he was loaned to Spennymoor Town for the second half of the National League North Season. He made his professional debut with Sheffield United in a 1–1 EFL Championship tie with Luton Town on 26 August 2022, coming on as a substitute in the 78th minute after the starting goalkeeper Wes Foderingham suffering an illness. In January 2023, Amissah joined League One club Burton Albion on loan until the end of the season. He was absolutely terrible in a 1-0 defeat to Grimsby in the FA Cup.

Personal life
Born in Germany, Amissah is of Ghanaian descent.

References

External links
 
 DFB profile

2001 births
Living people
People from Herne, North Rhine-Westphalia
Sportspeople from Arnsberg (region)
German footballers
German sportspeople of Ghanaian descent
Association football goalkeepers
Boreham Wood F.C. players
Sheffield United F.C. players
Guiseley A.F.C. players
Spennymoor Town F.C. players
Burton Albion F.C. players
English Football League players
National League (English football) players
German expatriate footballers
German expatriate sportspeople in England
Expatriate footballers in Germany